Mercy is a 2009 American independent romantic drama film directed  by Patrick Hoelck and written  by Scott Caan, who also  serves as lead actor and producer.

Plot
A meandering and not too bright quasi celebrity is conflicted by his aimless and wannabe high living lifestyle.

Cast
 Scott Caan as Johnny Ryan
 Wendy Glenn as Mercy Bennett
 Troy Garity as Dane Harrington
 Alexie Gilmore as Chris
 Erika Christensen as Robin
 Dylan McDermott as Jake
 James Caan as Gerry Ryan
 Whitney Able as Heather
 John Boyd as Erik

References

External links

2009 romantic drama films
2009 films
American romantic drama films
2000s English-language films
2000s American films